Plasmodium audaciosum is a parasite of the genus Plasmodium.

Like all Plasmodium species P. audaciosum has both vertebrate and insect hosts. The vertebrate hosts for this parasite are reptiles.

Description 

This organism was described by Lainson, Shaw and Landau in 1975.

Geographical occurrence 

This species is found in Brazil.

Clinical features and host pathology 

The only known host is the South American 'chameleon' (Plica umbra).

References 

audaciosum